Ney Siah (also Romanized as Ney Sīāh, Ney Seyāh, and Ney Siyah) is a village in Shoaybiyeh-ye Gharbi Rural District, Shadravan District, Shushtar County, Khuzestan Province, Iran. At the 2006 census, its population was 244, in 41 families.

References 

Populated places in Shushtar County